Prior to its uniform adoption of proportional representation in 1999, the United Kingdom used first-past-the-post for the European elections in England, Scotland and Wales. The European Parliament constituencies used under that system were smaller than the later regional constituencies and only had one Member of the European Parliament each.

The constituency of North East Scotland was one of them.

Boundaries
1979-1984: Aberdeen North, Aberdeen South, Aberdeenshire East, Aberdeenshire West, Angus North and Mearns, Angus South, Dundee East, Dundee West,
1984-1999: Aberdeen North, Aberdeen South, Angus East, Banff and Buchan, Dundee East, Dundee West, Gordon, Kincardine and Deeside, North Tayside

Members of the European Parliament

Election results

References

External links
 David Boothroyd's United Kingdom Election Results

European Parliament constituencies in Scotland (1979–1999)
1979 establishments in Scotland
1999 disestablishments in Scotland
Constituencies established in 1979
Constituencies disestablished in 1999